Batyr (May 24, 1970 – August 26, 1993) was an Asian elephant claimed to be able to use a large amount of meaningful human speech. Living in a zoo in Kazakhstan in the Soviet Union, Batyr was reported as having a vocabulary of more than 20 phrases.
A recording of Batyr saying "Batyr is good", his name and using words such as drink and give was played on Kazakh state radio and on the Soviet Central Television programme Vremya in 1980.

Like all cases of talking animals, these claims are subject to the observer-expectancy effect.

Biography
Born on May 24, 1970, at Almaty Zoo, Batyr lived his entire life in the Karaganda Zoo at Karaganda in Kazakhstan. He died in 1993. Batyr was the offspring of once-wild Indian elephants (a subspecies of the Asian elephant) and was the second child of his mother, Palm, (1959–1998) and father, Dubas, (1959–1978) presented to Kazakhstan's Almaty Zoo by the Indian Prime Minister Jawaharlal Nehru. The first baby elephant (Batyr's elder brother) was killed by his mother immediately after birth on May 15, 1968.

Abilities
Batyr, whose name is a Turkic word meaning 'dashing equestrian', 'man of courage' or 'athlete', was first alleged to speak just before New Year's Day in the winter of 1977 when he was seven years old.  Zoo employees were the first to notice his "speech", but he soon delighted zoo-goers at large by appearing to ask his attendants for water and regularly praising or (infrequently) chastising himself.  By 1979, his fame as the "speaking elephant" had spread in the wake of various mass-media stories about his abilities, many containing considerable fabrication and wild conjecture. Batyr's case was also included in several books on animal behaviour, and in the proceedings of several scientific conferences.  These developments drew a spate of zoo visitors, and brought the offer of an exchange—Batyr for a rare bonobo—from the Czechoslovak Circus; an offer rejected by the zoo's employees.

A. N. Pogrebnoj-Aleksandroff, a young worker at the zoo who studied Batyr's abilities and wrote many publications about him, said of the elephant:

Batyr, on the level of natural blares, [Batyr] said words (including human slang) by manipulating his trunk. By putting the trunk in his mouth, pressing a tip of the trunk to the bottom of the jaw and manipulating the tongue, [the elephant] said words. Besides, being in a corner of the cage (frequently at night) with the trunk softly hanging down, the elephant said words almost silently—a sound comparable with the sound of ultrasonic devices used against mosquitoes or the peep of mosquitoes, which human hearing hears well until approximately the age of 40. While pronouncing words, only the tip of the elephant's trunk is clamped inside [the mouth] and Batyr made subtle movements with a finger-shaped shoot on the trunk tip".

Various audiovisual recordings were made during Pogrebnoj-Aleksandroff's studies of Batyr and some of these have been transferred to Russia's Moscow State University for further study.

Death
Batyr died in 1993 when zookeepers accidentally gave him an overdose of sedatives. His death was reported worldwide.

Lexicon 
It is claimed that Batyr had a vocabulary of about 20 words in the Russian and Kazakh languages. He reportedly imitated the sounds of other animals, and uttered short phrases including words of human slang. Batyr's lexicon list was compiled from audiovisual records, scientific researches and statistical data from eyewitnesses who heard the elephant themselves. Individual and disputable sounds were not considered. All other words as reported by the media were treated as fiction, second-hand and interpretations of retellings. For example, the phrase heard from Batyr as water was reported as "the elephant asked to drink".

Full list of words and phrases reported to have been spoken by Batyr:
Using trunk in mouth:
 : 'Batyr', said abruptly;
 : 'I'm', said very abruptly, in combination with his name, using long pronunciation; I'm-Batyr sounded almost together;
 : 'Batyr', said thoughtfully-tenderly and lingeringly;
 …: 'Batyr, Batyr, Batyr', joyfully running in a cage;
 : , an affectionate version of the name Batyr;
 : 'water', a request;
 : 'good', as in good fellow;
 : 'good Batyr';
 : 'Oh-yo', sonorously;
 : 'fool', seldom and abruptly;
 : 'bad', rarely;
 : 'bad Batyr', rarely;
 : 'go';
 : 'go to hell', obscene Russian phrase; said for the first and only time during a telecast shooting;
 : Russian curse word for 'penis', seldom and abruptly;
 : short form of  'grandmother'; short children's sound ;
 : 'yes';
 : 'give (me)';
 : 'give, give, give';
 : 'one, two, three', while dancing, turning and hopping.

Other sounds: 
 A human-like whistle;
 Human speech allegedly uttered at infrasonic and ultrasonic frequencies;
 A gnashing sound imitative of rubber or polyfoam (foam plastic) on glass;
 The peep of rats or mice;
 The bark of dogs;
 The natural trumpeting of elephants.

Press 
Reporter Richard Beeston in Moscow wrote the article "Soviet Zoo Has Talking Elephant":

Publication

Scientific
 Scientific conference, Agricultural Institute, Tselinograd, in Kazakhstan, 1983–1989
 The International Practical Science conference for the anniversary of Moscow Zoo, in Russia, 1984
 The International Practical Science conference for the anniversary of the Almaty Zoo, in Kazakhstan, 1987
 The International Practical Science conference in Tallinn, Estonia, 1989
 The International zoological conference; Institute of Zoology — Academy of Science, Ukraine, 1989
 The International Practical Science conference for the 125 anniversary of Leningrad Zoo,  Saint Petersburg, Russia, 1990

In books 
 The True History or Who is Talking? An Elephant!, Dr. A. Pogrebnoj-Alexandroff, 1979-1993. 
 Reincarnation-Перевоплощение, Dr. A. Pogrebnoj-Alexandroff, 2001. 
 Speaking Animals, A. Dubrov, 2001. 
 Speaking Birds and Animals, O. Silaeva, V. Ilyichev, A. Dubrov, 2005.

Media 
 Student documentary film: Who speaks? The elephant… — VGIK — Moscow (USSR)
 Audio recording of Batyr's voice by scientist and writer Dr. A. Pogrebnoj-Alexandroff (1979–1983)

See also
Kosik (elephant)
Alex (parrot)
Talking birds
Talking animal
N'kisi
Koko (gorilla)
Washoe (chimpanzee)
Animal language
List of individual elephants

References 

1970 animal births
1993 animal deaths
Ethology
Individual elephants
Talking animals
Zoos in Kazakhstan
Karaganda
Individual animals in Kazakhstan